The Merișoara is a right tributary of the river Jiul de Vest in Romania. It flows into the Jiul de Vest in the city Vulcan.

References

Rivers of Romania
Rivers of Hunedoara County